Sexual and reproductive health and rights or SRHR is the concept of human rights applied to sexuality and reproduction. It is a combination of four fields that in some contexts are more or less distinct from each other, but less so or not at all in other contexts. These four fields are sexual health, sexual rights, reproductive health and reproductive rights. In the concept of SRHR, these four fields are treated as separate but inherently intertwined.

Distinctions between these four fields are not always made. Sexual health and reproductive health are sometimes treated as synonymous to each other, as are sexual rights and reproductive rights. In some cases, sexual rights are included in the term sexual health, or vice versa. Not only do different non-governmental organisations (NGOs) and governments organisations  use different terminologies, but different terminologies are often used within the same organization.

Some of the notable global NGOs that fight for sexual and reproductive health and rights include IPPF (International Planned Parenthood Federation), ILGA (International Lesbian and Gay Alliance), WAS (World Association for Sexual Health - formerly known as World Association for Sexology), the Center for Health and Gender Equity, and International HIV/AIDS Alliance.

History 
Government-run family planning programs first began in the 1950s. However, the main objectives of these programs were often centered around population control for economic growth and development. In 1994, the International Conference on Population and Development (ICPD) in Cairo, Egypt marked a significant shift in perspective in regards to reproductive health and is considered to be the birth of the modern SRHR movement. Over the course of the conference, debates surrounding family planning shifted from that of economics to that of public health and human rights. A Program of Action (PoA) was developed by the end of the ICPD and was approved and adopted by 179 countries. The PoA affirmed sexual and reproductive health as a universal human right and outlined global goals and objectives for improving reproductive heath based around central themes of free choice, women's empowerment, and viewing sexual and reproductive health in terms of physical and emotional well-being. The PoA outlined a series of goals, based on a central mission of achieving universal access to reproductive health worldwide, that were aimed to be accomplished by 2015. In 2000, the Millennium Development Goals (MDGs) were developed, and although reproductive health was not explicitly stated as one of the goals, it became an important component to Goals 3, 4, and 5.  In 2010, the original PoA was revisited by the United Nations and updated to reflect their objective of achieving universal reproductive health care by 2015. When the MDGs and ICPD PoA phased out in 2015, the next objectives for SRHR were folded into the Sustainable Development Goals, the next iteration of the MDGs which outline objectives to combat poverty through 2030.

Sexual health
The World Health Organization defines sexual health as: "Sexual health is a state of physical, mental and social well-being in relation to sexuality. It requires a positive and respectful approach to sexuality and sexual relationships, as well as the possibility of having pleasurable and safe sexual experiences, free of coercion, discrimination and violence."

Sexual rights
Unlike the other three aspects of SRHR, the struggle for sexual rights include, and focus on, sexual pleasure and emotional sexual expression. One platform for this struggle is the WAS Declaration of Sexual Rights.

The World Association for Sexual Health (WAS) was founded in 1978 by a multidisciplinary, world-wide group of NGOs to promote the field of sexology. 

The Platform for Action from the 1995 Beijing Conference on Women established that human rights include the right of women freely and without coercion, violence or discrimination, to have control over and make decisions concerning their own sexuality, including their own sexual and reproductive health. This paragraph has been interpreted by some countries as the applicable definition of women's sexual rights. The UN Commission on Human Rights has established that if women had more power, their ability to protect themselves against violence would be strengthened.

A significant shift occurred in the Association's history when in 1997, the World Congress of Sexology issued the Valencia Declaration of Sexual Rights. This was a visionary move on the part of María Pérez Conchillo and Juan José Borrás Valls (congress presidents) that shifted WAS to more of an advocacy organization championing sexual rights as fundamental to the promotion of sexual health and the field of sexology.  A press conference was held during the Congress to publicize the adoption of the Valencia Declaration and received world-wide attention.

This declaration has had world-wide impact in the recognition of the importance of sexual rights as human rights.  Besides the tremendous impact on WHO, our declaration provoked IPPF to issue its own declaration of Sexual Rights in 2008.

Subsequently, WAS made some revisions to the Valencia Declaration and proposed a WAS Declaration of Sexual Rights which was approved by the General Assembly at the 14th World Congress of Sexology (Hong Kong, 1999). The WAS adopted the Declaration of Sexual Rights, which originally included 11 sexual rights. It was heavily revised and expanded in March 2014 by the WAS Advisory Council to include 16 sexual rights:

 The right to equality and non-discrimination
 The right to life, liberty and security of the person
 The right to autonomy and bodily integrity
 The right to be free from torture and cruel, inhuman, or degrading treatment or punishment
 The right to be free from all forms of violence and coercion
 The right to privacy
 The right to the highest attainable standard of health, including sexual health; with the possibility of pleasurable, satisfying, and safe sexual experiences
 The right to enjoy the benefits of scientific progress and its application
 The right to information
 The right to education and the right to comprehensive sexuality education
 The right to enter, form, and dissolve marriage and similar types of relationships based on equality and full and free consent
 The right to decide whether to have children, the number and spacing of children, and to have the information and the means to do so
 The right to the freedom of thought, opinion, and expression
 The right to freedom of association and peaceful assembly
 The right to participation in public and political life
 The right to access to justice, remedies, and redress

This Declaration influenced The Yogyakarta Principles (which were launched as a set of international principles relating to sexual orientation and gender identity on 26 March 2007), especially on the idea of each person's integrity, and right to sexual and reproductive health.  

In 2015 the U.S. government said it would begin using the term "sexual rights" in discussions of human rights and global development.

Reproductive health

Within the framework of the World Health Organization's (WHO) definition of health as a state of complete physical, mental and social well-being, and not merely the absence of disease or infirmity, reproductive health, or sexual health/hygiene, addresses the reproductive processes, functions and system at all stages of life.  Reproductive health, therefore, implies that people are able to have a responsible, satisfying and safer sex life and that they have the capability to reproduce and the freedom to decide if, when and how often to do so. One interpretation of this implies that men and women ought to be informed of and to have access to safe, effective, affordable and acceptable methods of birth control; also access to appropriate health care services of sexual, reproductive medicine and implementation of health education programs to stress the importance of women to go safely through pregnancy and childbirth could provide couples with the best chance of having a healthy infant. On the other hand, individuals do face inequalities in reproductive health services. Inequalities vary based on socioeconomic status, education level, age, ethnicity, religion, and resources available in their environment. It is possible for example, that low income individuals lack the resources for appropriate health services and the knowledge to know what is appropriate for maintaining reproductive health.

Reproductive rights

Reproductive rights are legal rights and freedoms relating to reproduction and reproductive health. The World Health Organization defines reproductive rights as follows:

Reproductive rights rest on the recognition of the basic right of all couples and individuals to decide freely and responsibly the number, spacing and timing of their children and to have the information and means to do so, and the right to attain the highest standard of sexual and reproductive health. They also include the right of all to make decisions concerning reproduction free of discrimination, coercion and violence.

The area of sexual and reproductive rights is influenced by contextual cultural and social norms, socioeconomic factors and existing laws and regulations. The social-structural climate may affect both the access to and quality of sexual and reproductive health care and interventions.

Goals and objectives 
Despite frequent changes to frameworks, overall goals for SRHR remain little changed. As first stipulated at the ICPD, universal reproductive health care remains the ultimate objective, and with each new framework, targets are developed to progress towards this. In the original ICPD Program of Action, the primary call was for universal access to healthcare, including reproductive healthcare, family planning and sexual health. Over time, these have expanded to include the right to access education regarding sexual and reproductive health, an end to female genital mutilation, and increased women's empowerment in social, political, and cultural spheres.

Special goals and targets were also created to address adolescent sexual and reproductive health needs. Adolescents are often the most vulnerable to risks associated with sexual activity, including HIV, due to personal and social issues such as feelings of isolation, child marriage, and stigmatization. Governments realized the importance of investing in the health of adolescents as a means of establishing future well-being for their societies. As a result, the Commission on Population and Development developed a series of fundamental rights for adolescents including the right to comprehensive sex education, the right to decide all matters related to their sexuality, and access to sexual and reproductive health services without discrimination (including safe abortions wherever legal).

See also 
 Abortion-rights movements
 Disability and sexuality
 Disability and women's health
 Freedom of choice
 LGBT rights by country or territory
 Right to sexuality
 Global Information Society Watch
 Sex workers' rights
 Sex Workers' Rights Movement

References 

Sex and the law
Reproductive rights
Right to health